Theresa "Tracy" Young, is an American electronic dance music DJ, producer, remixer, and owner of Ferosh Records. With more than 25 years in the music industry, Young has racked up over 60 No. 1 Billboard Dance hits and has collaborated on remixes with over 100 artists, including 14 exclusively for Madonna. The "I Rise" (Tracy Young Pride Intro Radio Remix) for Madonna received a nomination at the 62nd Annual Grammy Awards, in the Best Remixed Recording category, and won. This marked the first time a female producer had been nominated and won in this category.

Biography
Young attended T.C. Williams High School in Alexandria, Virginia.

In 1989, at 19, she DJed at frat parties at University of Maryland and later was the resident DJ at the Hill Haven Nightclub in Washington, D.C. Tracy graduated from the University of Maryland with a Bachelor's degree in Speech Communication.

Career
Young began her professional radio career as an intern at the urban-leaning rhythmic-formatted radio station WPGC 95.5FM in Washington D.C. while she was still attending the University of Maryland. Tracy became an on-air mix show deejay for several of the station's highly rated shows. She was soon promoted to Assistant Music Director and then became the stations Music Director where she remained for a year and a half before accepting a new position at Interscope Records. The new position resulted in her relocating to Miami, a city with a thriving club music scene. Shortly after her move, Young met club impresario Ingrid Casares who along with Chris Paciello opened Liquid nightclub in South Beach. Tracy had landed the permanent deejay residency position at Liquid and during her residency she served as the deejay for many events hosted by celebrities including Sean Puffy Combs, Russell Simmons, Cher, Ricky Martin and many others. It was during her time at Liquid, where Young first met Madonna. She was able to land a prominent gig to deejay a party celebrating the launch of Madonna's film The Next Best Thing. Their friendship and professional relationship blossomed and Tracy was asked to deejay Madonna's and Guy Ritchie's wedding in Scotland.

Throughout her career as a professional DJ, Young has served as a deejay for many events including The Emmy Awards, the Sundance Film Festival, Kylie Minogue's 2011 North American tour, and Britney Spears 21st birthday. In 2003, Young launched her own record label, Ferosh Records and she also began serving as executive producer of the annual New Year's Day party called Genesis. She actively supports philanthropic causes and has held fundraising campaigns for various LGBT charities such as GLAAD, GMHC, Elton John AIDS Foundation and The National Gay and Lesbian Task Force. In addition, Young has been a featured talent for Pride Festivals all around the world since 1990.

Young has appeared in numerous television programs such as MTV's House of Style, BET's Rap City, E!'s Kourtney & Khloe Take Miami, Bravo's Real Housewives of Atlanta, The Real Housewives of Miami and LOGO reality-television series, The A-List: New York.

In 2017, Young was tapped to remix the campaign song for Hillary Clinton's run for the Presidency of the United States Of America. The song titled "Stronger Together" features recording artist Jessica Sanchez.

Young's career in the music industry and Billboard Dance Chart history has been featured in the following press: DJ Times, Advocate, Billboard Magazine, LOGO, and HuffPost.

Discography

Albums

EPs

Original Singles

Compilation Appearances

Remixes

References

External links 

1970 births
Living people
Remixers
American dance musicians
American electronic musicians
American house musicians
American radio personalities
Record producers from Virginia
American television personalities
American women television personalities
Club DJs
Electronic dance music DJs
American lesbian musicians
LGBT people from Virginia
Musicians from Charlottesville, Virginia
21st-century American women musicians
American women record producers
American women in electronic music
T. C. Williams High School alumni
20th-century American LGBT people
21st-century American LGBT people